Luis Jose Hernández Paniagua (born 6 February 1998) is a Costa Rican professional footballer who plays for Santos de Guápiles F.C. in the Liga FPD.

Career
When he was captain of the Costa Rica under-17 team Hernández trained with the Manchester United team and was strongly rumoured to be signed by Louis Van Gaal for the English side however the transfer didn’t materialise. He made his professional debut on loan at Municipal Grecia before returning to Saprossa with whom he won four league titles before leaving to join Santos de Guapiles in 2021.

International career
He made his debut for the Costa Rica national football team appearing as a second-half substitute for Bryan Oviedo on 11 September 2018 against Japan at the Panasonic Stadium Suita.

References

Living people
1998 births
Costa Rica international footballers
Association football defenders
Deportivo Saprissa players
Municipal Grecia players
Costa Rican footballers